Nasser Rastegar-Nejad (Persian: ناصر رستگارنژاد; April 24, 1939 – December 13, 2018) was an Iranian Santur player. He released an album on the Nonesuch Records Explorer label. In 1968, a section of the track 'Dashti' (1:58 - 3:24), played by Nasser Rastegar-Nejad, and originally to be found on the album Mid East, volume 8, 1968, published by American Friends of the Middle East, was used in the film Performance to accompany the scene in which characters played by Mick Jagger and Anita Pallenberg make love. The track has since been re-released, along with others, on the Lyrichord album In A Persian Garden: The Santur in 2007.

Discography
  Music of Iran - Santur Recital, Vol 1, Lyrichord LLST 7135
 Mahur
 Bayat-e Esfehan & Saghinameh
 Homayun
 Shustari
  Music of Iran - Santur Recital, Vol 3, Lyrichord LLST 7166
 Dashti
 Shur
 Abu-Ata
 Afshari
The Persian Santur: Music Of Iran, Nonesuch Explorer Records

See also
Nonesuch Records discography

References

External links
Rastegar-Nejad at Allmusic website

Iranian santur players